Tatyana Volozhanina (born 28 January 2003) is a Bulgarian individual rhythmic gymnast.

Career
She started training rhythmic gymnastics at the age of five in Irkutsk, Russia. In 2015, she moved to Bulgaria with her family. In July 2017, International Gymnastics Federation allowed her to start competing for Bulgaria.

Junior
Her first major competition was the 2018 European Championships in Guadalajara, Spain. She competed with all four apparatuses and helped Bulgaria win bronze medal in Team competition. She also won silver medal in Hoop final and placed 5th in Ball, 6th in Clubs and 4th in Ribbon final. Later that year, she competed at the 2018 Youth Olympic Games and placed 5th in All-around final.

Senior
She competed at the 2021 World Championships in Kitakyushu, Japan and placed 7th in All-around final. She also qualified to two apparatus finals, finishing 7th with Ball and 5th with Ribbon.

Routine music information

References

External links 
 
 

2003 births
Living people
Sportspeople from Irkutsk
Bulgarian rhythmic gymnasts
Gymnasts at the 2018 Summer Youth Olympics
Russian emigrants to Bulgaria